The 2012–13 Argentine Torneo Argentino A was the eighteenth season of third division professional football in Argentina. A total of 25 teams competed; the champion was promoted to Primera B Nacional.

Club information

North Zone

South Zone

1 Play their home games at Estadio José María Minella.

First stage

North Zone

South Zone

Second Stage

Reválida Stage

Zone A

Racing (C) was ineligible for the Second Round, as it was involved in relegation.

Overall standings
The overall standings for the seven teams of Zone A include the regular season and the first round of the Reválida. The bottom team relegates to the Torneo Argentino B, while the next-to-last team plays the relegation play-off with a team from such category. Those two teams cannot qualify for the second round of the Reválida.

Tiebreaker

Zone B

Overall standings
The overall standings for the seven teams of Zone B include the regular season and the first round of the Reválida. The bottom team relegates to the Torneo Argentino B, while the next-to-last team plays the relegation play-off with a team from such category. Those two teams cannot qualify for the second round of the Reválida.

Torneo Argentino B relegation play-off

Second round

Third round

Third Stage

Fourth Stage

Fifth Stage

Sixth Stage

See also
2012–13 in Argentine football

References

3
Torneo Argentino A seasons